The trumpet repertoire consists of solo literature and orchestral or, more commonly, band parts written for the trumpet. Tracings its origins to 1500 BC, the trumpet is a musical instrument with the highest register in the brass family.

Among the repertoire for the trumpet are the following works:

Solo trumpet

Samuel Adler, Canto I, for B-flat or C trumpet
Louis Andriessen, A Very Sad Trumpet Sonata
Louis Andriessen, A Very Sharp Trumpet Sonata
Mark Applebaum, Authenticity
Mark Applebaum, Entre Funérailles I
Cecilia Arditto, Música Invisible, Libro IV, for flugelhorn and trumpet"
Richard Ayres, No. 27 "Blue"
Julian Azumi, Cardiogram
Sven-Erik Bäck, March and Song
Gerald Barry, Trumpeter
Luciano Berio, Good night
Lauren Bernofsky, Fantasia
Lisa Bielawa, Synopsis #5: He Figures Out What Clouds Mean
Harrison Birtwistle, Antiphonies from the Moonkeeper
Harrison Birtwistle, Five Little Antiphonies for Amelia
Daniel Börtz, Målning
Howard J. Buss, A Day in the City, Commemoration
Elliott Carter, Retracing III
Aaron Cassidy, What then renders these forces visible is a strange smile (or, First Study for Figures at the Base of a Crucifixion)
Friedrich Cerha, The Pied Piper
Nicolas Collins, Sonnet 40
Peter Maxwell Davies, Litany – for a Ruined Chapel between Sheep and Shore, for solo C trumpet
Peter Maxwell Davies, Sonatina, for solo trumpet
Lucia Dlugoszewski, Space Is a Diamond
Axel Dörner, Clinamen
Axel Dörner, Komposition für trompete-solo, No. 1
Axel Dörner, Komposition für trompete-solo, No. 2
Axel Dörner, marchugk
Amy Dunker, Chet
Amy Dunker, Cruise Control
Amy Dunker, Distant Voices
Amy Dunker, Hush!
Amy Dunker, Improvisation on Raga Asvari
Amy Dunker, Prelude-Doina
Amy Dunker, Satchmo
Anders Eliasson, Prelude
Robert Erickson, Kryl, for solo C trumpet
Ivan Fedele, High, for solo B-flat trumpet
Morton Feldman, A Very Short Trumpet Piece
Stanley Friedman, Solus
HK Gruber, Exposed Throat
Anthony Halstead, Suite for solo trumpet or horn
Robert Henderson, Variation Movements for trumpet solo
Hans Werner Henze, Sonatina, for trumpet
Åke Hermanson, Fanfare
Hans Holewa, Little Fanfare
Robin Holloway, Sonata for solo trumpet
Adriana Hölszky, Projektion
Adriana Hölszky, Weltenenden, for one or four brass players
Tom Johnson, Tilework
Betsy Jolas, Épisode troisième
Mauricio Kagel, Old/New, for trumpet
Mauricio Kagel, Morceau de Concours
Laura Kaminsky, Elegy for the Silenced Voice
Maurice Karkoff, Fanfare Fantasy, Op. 154
 Otto Ketting, Intrada, for unnacompanied trumpet or horn
Hanna Kulenty, Brass No. 1, for double bell trumpet
Eres Holz, MACH, for B-flat trumpet (2011)
Libby Larsen, Fanfare for the Women, for solo C trumpet
Robert Hall Lewis, Monophony VII, for trumpet solo
Ingvar Lidholm, Epigram
György Ligeti, The Big Turtle-Fanfare from the South China Sea
Liza Lim, Wild-Winged One
Witold Lutosławski, Tune
Miklós Maros, Fanfare
Ron Mazurek, Dialogues
Arne Mellnäs, The Unquestioned Answer (Hommage to Charles Ives)
Dexter Morrill, Nine Pieces
Jan W. Morthenson, Memory
Isabel Mundry, Solo auf Schwellen, for double bell trumpet
Sergiu Natra, Sonatina
Olga Neuwirth, Laki, for solo C trumpet
Per Nørgård, Scale – Fanfare – Variation
Nigel Osborne, Flamingo Time-Line
Martijn Padding, One Trumpet
Vincent Persichetti, Parable XIV for Trumpet, Op. 127
Matthias Pintscher, Shining Forth
Anthony Plog, Postcards
Folke Rabe, Shazam
Gottfried Reiche, Abblasen
Bruno Reinhardt, Music for Trumpet Solo
Verne Reynolds, Solus
Wolfgang Rihm, Little Echo Fantasy
Jay Rizzetto, Five Poems of Emily Dickinson for Solo Trumpet and Narrator
Scott Robbins, "Three Blues for Cello and Trumpet"
Poul Ruders, Reveille-Retraite
Ari Rufeisen, Dodecaphonic Principles
David Sampson, Litany of Breath
David Sampson, Morning Pages
David Sampson, Solo for flugelhorn
David Sampson, Trumpet Descants on Christmas Hymns
David Sampson, Trumpet Descants on Festive Hymns
Giacinto Scelsi, Four Pieces
Rebecca Saunders, Blaauw, for double bell trumpet
Daniel Schnyder "ADAR" for solo tp
Kurt Schwertsik, Stretch & Yawn
Roberto Sierra, Fanfare
Juan María Solare, Israfil
Juan María Solare, Unterwegs
Juan María Solare, Perlas esparcidas
Juan María Solare, Weise weiße Weisen
Juan María Solare, Serpentine
Juan María Solare, Reverence (Homage to Bach)
Juan María Solare, Petite Suite Antique
Juan María Solare, Art-Man, for double bell trumpet
Juan María Solare, Avanti
Karlheinz Stockhausen, Eingang und Formel, for solo B-flat trumpet
Karlheinz Stockhausen, In Freundschaft, for solo 4-valve E-flat trumpet
Karlheinz Stockhausen, Oberlippentanz, for solo B-flat piccolo trumpet
Karlheinz Stockhausen, Harmonien, for solo C trumpet
Egmont Swaan, De zucht van Marib..., for piccolo trumpet
Toru Takemitsu, Paths, for solo C trumpet
Hilary Tann, Look Little Low Heavens
Antoine Tisné, Emotion, for C trumpet solo
Mark-Anthony Turnage, An Aria With Dancing, for solo B-flat trumpet
Skye van Duuren, Aurae, for solo B-flat trumpet
Stefan Wolpe, Solo Piece for Trumpet
Nadav Ziv, Monologue
Valentin Zubiaurre, Audition Piece for Trumpet

Trumpet ensemble

Anonymous, Sinfonia a due Trombe
Sally Beamish, Fanfare for 2 trumpets
Heinrich Ignaz Biber, Duets for 2 trumpets
Heinrich Ignaz Biber, Sonata for 2 trumpets, 2 violins, 2 violas & continuo No. 1 in C major, C. 114
Heinrich Ignaz Biber, Sonata for 2 trumpets, 2 violins & continuo No. 7 in G major, C. 120
Heinrich Ignaz Biber, Sonata for 2 trumpets, 2 violins, 2 violas & continuo No. 12 in C major, C. 125
Larry Bitensky, Fanfare for 6 trumpets and tympani
Harrison Birtwistle, Placid Mobile for 36 trumpets
Vassily Brandt, Country Pictures for 4 trumpets
Henry Brant, Flight Over a Global Map for 100 or 56 trumpets and percussion
Henry Brant, Millennium I for 8 trumpets and 3 percussionists
Benjamin Britten, Fanfare for St Edmundsbury for 3 trumpets
Bruce Broughton, Contest Piece for Eight Trumpets for 8 trumpets
Howard J. Buss, Festive Overture for 8 trumpets
Howard J. Buss, Prelude and Intrada for 4 trumpets
Howard J. Buss, Rendezvous for 4 trumpets and one percussion
Howard J. Buss, The Walls of Jericho for solo trumpet and 6-part trumpet ensemble
Elliott Carter, Birthday Flourish for 5 trumpets (or brass quintet)
Elliott Carter, Canon for Three for 3 trumpets
Axel Dörner, treucht for 3 trumpets
Joseph Drew, 7
Amy Dunker, Fanfare for One Uncommon Man for 3 trumpets
Amy Dunker, Florisshen for 6 trumpets
Amy Dunker, Gasconade Fanfare for 4 trumpets
Amy Dunker, Heralding for 5 trumpets
Amy Dunker, One Blackbird for 6 trumpets and vibraphone
John Emche, Trundle for 8 trumpets
Eric Ewazen, A Concert Fanfare for 6 trumpets
Eric Ewazen, Fantasia for Seven Trumpets
Eric Ewazen, Prelude and Fugue for Trumpet Choir for 6 trumpets
Eric Ewazen, Sonatina for Two Trumpets
Eric Ewazen, Sonoran Desert Harmonies for 8 trumpets
Stanley Friedman, Trumpets of Solomon for two trumpets
Sofia Gubaidulina, Trio for 3 trumpets
Franz Hackl, Chegg for 3 trumpets
Terry Halco, Jubilate for 2 trumpets and organ
Cristóbal Halffter, Little Fanfare for Two Trumpets
Bengt Hambraeus, A Small Concert Piece for trumpet and tomtom
Theodore Holdheim, Capriccio for 2 trumpets
Robin Holloway, Sonata for 2 trumpets
Eres Holz, Weisse Wunden music theatre for three trumpets and video (2008)
Bertold Hummel, Saeckingen for 6 trumpets and timpani, Op. 103f (2000)
Mauricio Kagel, Fanfanfaren for 4 trumpets
Mauricio Kagel, Morceau de Concours for 2 trumpets
Fabien Lévy, à peu près de for 2 trumpets
Johann Jacob Löwe, Capriccio No. 1 for 2 trumpets and continuo
Johann Jacob Löwe, Capriccio No. 2 for 2 trumpets and continuo
Frederik Magle, The Fairest of Roses (Den yndigste rose) for two trumpets and organ
Peter Maxwell Davies, Quintet for 5 trumpets
Kevin McKee, Dürrenhorn Passage for 6 trumpets
Erik Morales, Birds of Paradise for 6 trumpets/flugelhorns
Erik Morales, Cityscapes for 5 trumpets
Erik Morales, Conquest for 6 trumpets
Erik Morales, Crystal Spheres for 8 trumpets/flugelhorns
Erik Morales, Cyclone for 5 trumpets/flugelhorns
Erik Morales, Infinite Ascent for 8 trumpets
Erik Morales, Metallic Fury for 5 trumpets/flugelhorns
Erik Morales, Music from Strange Places for 7 trumpets
Erik Morales, Path of Discovery for 5 trumpets/flugelhorns
Erik Morales, X1 for 5 trumpets
Grainne Mulvey, Trinity Fanfare for 2 trumpets and organ
Menahem Nebenhaus, Fanfare for 4 trumpets
Ben-Zion Orgad, Melosalgia for 2 trumpets
Martjin Padding, 23 sentences & autograph for double bell trumpet and two echo trumpets
Bryan Page, Middle Movement for trumpet ensemble
Bryan Page, Slow & Fast for trumpet ensemble
Robert Paterson, Fanfare for 6 Trumpets
Krzysztof Penderecki, Luzerner Fanfare for 8 trumpets and percussion
Vincent Persichetti, Parable XXV for 2 Trumpets, op. 164
Johann Christoph Pezel, Sonata No. 69 for 2 trumpets and continuo
Johann Christoph Pezel, Sonata No. 71 for 2 trumpets and continuo
Johann Christoph Pezel, Sonata No. 75 for 2 trumpets and continuo
Verne Reynolds, Calls and Echoes for 2 trumpets
Brandon Ridenour, The Revenge of Tal for 6 trumpets
Lucia Ronchetti, Dazbog for soprano and 2 trumpets
Carl Ruggles, Angels for 6 muted trumpets
David Sampson, Flight for 3 trumpets
David Sampson, Inamere for 12 trumpets
David Sampson, Notes from Faraway Places for 2 trumpets
Elliott Schwartz, Downeast Fanfare for 3 trumpets
Stefano Scodanibbio, Plaza for 4 trumpets
Judith Shatin, Hearing the Call for 2 trumpets and 2 snare drums
 Martin Smolka,  pianissimo for 4 trumpets with bucket mutes
Juan María Solare, Aquelarre (tercera noche de Walpurgis) for 3 trumpets
Juan María Solare, Fun-fare for 4 trumpets and a drum
Juan María Solare, Fricción for 2 trumpets
James Stephenson, NEXT-Calibur for 3 trumpets and orchestra
Thomas Stevens, A New Carnival of Venice for four trumpets and orchestra
Thomas Stevens, Triangles for 3 trumpets
Gabriel Stockhausen, Firestorm
Karlheinz Stockhausen, Donnerstags Abschied for 5 trumpets
Karlheinz Stockhausen, Michaels-Ruf for 4 trumpets
Karlheinz Stockhausen, Trumpetent for 4 trumpets
Igor Stravinsky, Fanfare for a New Theatre for 2 trumpets
Josef Tal, Fanfare for 3 trumpets & 3 trombones
Georg Philipp Telemann, Concerto No. 1 for 3 trumpets and timpani in D Major, TWV 54:D3
Georg Philipp Telemann, Concerto No. 2 for 3 trumpets and timpani in D Major, TWV 54:D4
Henri Tomasi, Trio for 3 trumpets
Joan Tower, Fanfare for the Uncommon Woman (No. 5) for 4 trumpets
Joseph Turrin, Festival Fanfare for 8 trumpets
Phil Winsor, Anamorphoses
Kenny Wheeler, Trumpet Quartet
Charles Wuorinen, Epithalamium for 2 trumpets
Charles Wuorinen, Big Epithalamium for 8, 12 or 16 trumpets
La Monte Young, The Second Dream of the High-Tension Line Stepdown Transformer for 8 trumpets
John Zorn, Antiphonal Fanfare for the Great Hall for 6 trumpets

Brass trio

Leroy Anderson, Bugler's Holiday
Arshak Andriasov, Brass Trio, op. 9
Leslie Bassett, Brass Trio
Joseph Blaha, French Suite
Lauren Bernofsky, Trio for Brass
Salvador Brotons, Brass Trio, op. 96
Howard J. Buss, "Trigon" for trumpet, trombone, and tuba
Axel Dörner, larft, for trumpet, trombone and tuba
Eric Ewazen, A Philharmonic Fanfare
Arthur Frackenpohl, Trio
Pierre Gabaye, Recréation, for trio and piano
Walter Hartley, Two Pastiches
Frigyes Hidas, Triga
Douglas Hill, Abe Lincoln's Songbook
Warner Hutchison, Mini-Suite for Brass Trio
Jan Koetsier, Figaro Metamorphosen
Otto Leuning, Trio
Jean Louël, Trio
Wayne Lu, Partita
Jean-Francois Michel, Suite
Robert Muczynski, Voyages for Brass Trio
Václav Nelhýbel, Trio for Brass
Anthony Plog, Trio for Brass
Francis Poulenc, Sonata for horn, trumpet & trombone
Lucia Ronchetti, Laura o delle simmetrie in ombra
Verne Reynolds, Trio
Arne Running, Aria and Allegro
David Sampson, Duncan Trio
Robert Sanders, Trio for Brass Instruments
Samuel Scheidt, Drei Symphonien
Patrick Schulz, Refractions II
Daniel Schnyder, Trio
Lowell Shaw, A Pocket Full of Wry
John D. Stevens, Triangles
Alexandre Tansman, Miniatures
Edward Troupin, "Divertimento"
Fisher Tull, Trio
Steven Winteregg, Capital Dances
Nadav Ziv, Events

Brass quintet
See Brass quintet repertoire

Brass ensemble

Arshak Andriasov, Torch, No. 1, Op. 6A for Trumpet, Trombone, Piano, and String Quintet
Pierre Ancelin, Tres leys per Ventadour, version for trumpet, two horns, trombone and tuba
Lauren Bernofsky, Passacaglia for brass ensemble 
David Borden, Dialogues for trombone & trumpet
Howard J. Buss, Brom Bones for 4 trumpets, one horn, 3 tenor trombones, one bass trombone, and tuba
Howard J. Buss, Three Jazzicals for trumpet and tuba
Howard J. Buss, Time Capsule in versions for flute and trumpet, and trumpet and trombone
Howard J. Buss, Chromatic Fantasy for 2 trumpets, horn, trombone, and tuba
Howard J. Buss, Concord for 2 trumpets, horn, trombone, and tuba
Howard J. Buss, Contrasts in Blue for trumpet, trombone and piano
Howard J. Buss, Sonic Fables: Lessons from Aesop for 2 trumpets, horn, trombone, tuba, and one percussion
Howard J. Buss, Trigon for trumpet, trombone and tuba
Wen-Chung Chou, Soliloquy of a bhiksuni, for trumpet with brass and percussion ensemble
Axel Dörner, Örxome for 4 trumpets, 4 trombones, 4 saxophones, bass clarinet, 2 pianos, double bass and drums/percussion
Louis Durey, Interlude for 4 trumpets, 4 horns, 3 trombones, tuba and tympani, Op. 112
Malcolm Forsyth, Aphorisms for trumpet, two horns, trombone and tuba
Philip Glass, Brass Sextet for 2 trumpets, 2 horns, trombone and tuba
Stephen Gryc, Choral Prelude: Lasst uns erfreuen for 2 Trumpets, Horn, Trombone and Organ
Jacques Hétu, Fanfare pour une fête, 4 French horns, 4 trumpets, 4 trombones, tuba, 2000
Jacques Hétu, Fanfare pour Lanaudière, 4 French horns, 3 trumpets, 3 trombones, tuba
Fred Ho, Fanfare for the Creeping Meatball, for 2 trumpets and 2 trombones
Eres Holz, Vier Schatten, for 2 trumpets, french horn, trombone and tuba
André Jolivet, Fanfares pour Britannicus for brass ensemble
Ernst Leitner, Intrada, for two trumpets, two horns, two trombones, tuba and organ
Darius Milhaud, Fanfare for brass ensemble, Op.396
Darius Milhaud, Fanfare for 2 trumpets and trombone, Op.400
Bryan Page, Kick the Duck for brass band and percussion
Raymond Premru, Quartet, for brass quartet
Brandon Ridenour, Adagio for Brass for large brass ensemble
Brandon Ridenour, Fanfarrea Venezuela! for large brass ensemble
Jean Sibelius, Tiera for Brass Septet and Percussion, JS200 (1899)
R. Murray Schafer, Isfahan for three brass quintets
David Sampson, Winter Ceremony for 2 trumpets and percussion
Daniel Schnyder "Three American Dances" for 3tp,horn, 3tb and Tuba with ad lib percussion
Daniel Schnyder "Four Short Stories" for 3tp, horn, 3Tb and Tuba
Daniel Schnyder "Brass Symphony" for 4tp 2horns 3tp and Tuba
Daniel Schnyder "CUBAC" for 4 tp, 2 shorn, 3tb and Tuba with ad lib. perc
Clare Shore, Game Piece No. 1 for bells, violin and brass quartet
Karlheinz Stockhausen, Drachenkampf, for trumpet, trombone, and synthesizer
Germaine Tailleferre, Prélude et fugue for organ, 2 trumpets and 2 trombones
Michael Tippett, The Wolf Trap Fanfare, for three trumpets, two trombones and tuba
Mark-Anthony Turnage, Set To, for brass ensemble
Joseph Turrin, Jazzalogue for brass choir
Joseph Turrin, Fanfare a la carte for brass choir
Joseph Turrin, West Side Story Suite for brass choir
Joseph Turrin, Rhapsody Noel  for double brass quintet
Joseph Turrin, Rhapsody Noel  for brass band
Joseph Turrin, Three Carols  for double brass quintet
Joseph Turrin, Three Carols  for brass band
Joseph Turrin, Overture for Brass  for brass band
Joseph Turrin, Hymn for Diana  for brass band
Joseph Turrin, Rejoice and be Glad for brass band
Joseph Turrin, Animation  for brass band
JacobTV, Victory Over the Sun, for brass choir and percussion (1999)
William Walton, Introduction to the National Anthem, for three trumpets, three trombones and snare drum (orig. 12 trumpets)
Natalie Williams, Fanfare for Elder Conservatorium, for brass ensemble and tympani
Christian Wolff, Peace March 9, for brass choir and percussion

Trumpet and keyboard

Iosif Andriasov, Concertino for Trumpet and Piano, op. 14
Anonymous, Seis piezas de clarines para trompeta y organo on Themes by Lully
Byron Adams, Sonata for trumpet and piano
Stephen Adams, Holy City for trumpet and piano
Iosif Andriasian, "Tune" for trumpet and piano
George Antheil, Sonata, for trumpet and piano, W. 143
J.E. Barat, Andante and Scherzo
Carol Barratt, Bravo! Trumpet for trumpet and piano
Greg Bartholomew, Summer Suite for trumpet and piano
Howard Bashaw, Music for trumpet and piano
Leonard Bernstein, Rondo for Lifey for trumpet and piano
Larry Bitensky, From Those Beginning Notes of Yearning for trumpet and piano
Marcel Bitsch, Capriccio for trumpet and piano
Vladislav Blazhevich, Concerto No. 5 for trumpet and piano
Rory Boyle, 4 Bagatelles for trumpet and piano
Eugène Bozza, Lied, Badinage and Caprice, for trumpet and piano
Vassily Brandt, Concertpiece No. 1 Opus 11 for trumpet and piano
Vassily Brandt, Concertpiece Opus 12 for trumpet and piano
Yehezkel Braun, Sonata for trumpet and piano
Howard J. Buss, Meditation and Caprice for trumpet and piano
Howard J. Buss, Skylines for trumpet and piano
Fulvio Caldini, Blue for trumpet and piano, op. 37/a
Fulvio Caldini, Sonatina in Fanfara for trumpet and piano, op. 65/D
George Chave, One for the Colonel for trumpet and piano
Théo Charlier: Solo de Concours
Jean Clergue, Sarabande et Rigaudon
Georgy Dimitriv, Concertino for trumpet and piano
Amy Dunker, Postcards (and Memories) for trumpet and piano
George Enescu, Légende, for trumpet and piano
Hans Ulrich Engelmann, Epitaph für einen imaginären Freund, for trumpet and piano
Thierry Escaich, Tanz-Fantasie for trumpet and piano or organ
Eric Ewazen, Sonata for Trumpet and Piano
Stanley Friedman, Sonata for Trumpet and Piano
Girolamo Fantini, Sonata Nos. 1–8 for trumpet and organ
Sandro Gorli, Corrente for trumpet and piano
Richard Halligan, Meditation, for trumpet and piano
Thorvald Hansen, Sonata for Cornet & Piano, Op. 18
Jennifer Higdon, Trumpet Songs for trumpet and piano
Paul Hindemith, Trumpet Sonata
Carl Höhne, Slavische Fantasie for cornet and piano
Theodore Holdheim, Sonata for trumpet and piano
Arthur Honegger, Intrada, for C trumpet and piano, H 193
Bertold Hummel, Sonatina for trumpet and piano, Op. 1a
Bertold Hummel, Invocationes for trumpet and organ, Op. 68a
Bertold Hummel, Trio for trumpet, percussion and piano, Op. 82a
Jacques Ibert, Impromptu
Norman Dello Joio, Sonata for Trumpet and Piano
André Jolivet, Air de Bravoure for trumpet and piano
Kent Kennan, Sonata for trumpet and piano
Lev Kogan, Concerto for trumpet and piano
Meyer Kupferman, Three Ideas for trumpet and piano
HyeKyung Lee, Frenetic Dream, for trumpet and piano
Thomas Larcher, Uchafu for trumpet and piano
Morten Lauridsen, Sonata for trumpet and piano
David Loeb, Litany for trumpet and piano
David Loeb, Moresca for trumpet and piano
Frederik Magle, Kosmos for trumpet and organ
Bohuslav Martinů, Sonatina for Trumpet & Piano, H. 357
Kevin McKee, Centennial Horizon for trumpet and piano
Sergiu Natra, Music for Harp and Three Brass Instruments
Philip de Oliveira, Fanfare for trumpet and piano
Johann Ludwig Krebs, Fantasie in C major for trumpet and organ
Johann Ludwig Krebs, Fantasie in D major for trumpet and organ
Karl Pilß, Sonata for trumpet and piano (1935)
Bryan Page, Meditation on America for trumpet and organ
Julien Porret, 14th Solo de Concours for trumpet and piano
Robert Pound, Sleep Cycle for trumpet and piano
William Presser, Suite for trumpet and piano
Brandon Ridenour, Fantasy on Malaguena for trumpet and piano
Brandon Ridenour, Scherzo for trumpet and piano
Brandon Ridenour, Sonata for trumpet and piano
Brandon Ridenour, Theme and Variations on Chopsticks for trumpet and piano
Verne Reynolds, Fantasy-Etudes for trumpet and piano
Verne Reynolds, Sonata for trumpet and piano
Jean-Baptiste Robin, Récits Héroïques (Heroic Tales) for trumpet and organ
David Sampson, The Mysteries Remain for trumpet and organ
Somei Satoh, Hikari(Light) for trumpet and piano
Joseph Guy Ropartz, Andante et Allegro for trumpet and piano
Sergio Schmilovich, Infinitum for trumpet and piano
Daniel Schnyder, Sonata for Trumpet and Piano
Adam Schoenberg, Separated by Space for trumpet and piano
Nikos Skalkottas, Concertino for trumpet and piano
James Stephenson, 2/2 Tango for trumpet and piano
James Stephenson, Bagatelle for piccolo trumpet with piano or organ
James Stephenson, Burden of Destiny for trumpet and piano
James Stephenson, Divertimento for piccolo trumpet and organ
James Stephenson, Fanfare for an Angel for trumpet and organ
James Stephenson, Fantasie for trumpet and piano
James Stephenson, Glimmers of Hope for trumpet and organ
James Stephenson, Mutation for trumpet and piano
James Stephenson, Reflections for trumpet and piano
James Stephenson, Remember Forward for trumpet and piano
James Stephenson, Serendipity for trumpet and piano
James Stephenson, Sonata for trumpet and piano
James Stephenson, Song for trumpet with piano or organ
James Stephenson, Sound and Fury for trumpet and organ
James Stephenson, Variations on a Theme by Haydn for trumpet and piano
Max Stern, Tamid for trumpet and piano
Halsey Stevens, Sonata for trumpet and piano
John Stevens, Sonata for trumpet and piano
Dwight Stone, Pastorale for trumpet and piano; excerpt; score
Robert Suderburg, Chamber Music VII ("Ceremonies"), for trumpet and piano
Robert Suderburg, Chamber Music VIII (Sonata for trumpet and piano)
Germaine Tailleferre, Choral for trumpet and piano
Germaine Tailleferre, Galliarde for trumpet and piano
Henri Tomasi, Triptyque for trumpet and piano
Joseph Turrin, Caprice for trumpet and piano
Joseph Turrin, Three Episodes for trumpet and piano
Joseph Turrin, Four Miniatures for trumpet and piano
Joseph Turrin, Two Portraits for trumpet with Flugelhorn double and piano
Joseph Turrin, Fandango for trumpet, trombone and piano
Joseph Turrin, Escapade for piccolo trumpet and piano
Pavel Josef Vejvanovský, Sonata a 4 in G minor for trumpet and organ
Giovanni Viviani, Sonata No. 1 for trumpet and organ
Giovanni Viviani, Sonata No. 2 for trumpet and organ
Alec Wilder, Sonata for trumpet and piano
Charles Wuorinen, Nature's Concord for trumpet and piano

Chamber music with trumpet

Tomaso Albinoni, Concerto for trumpet, 3 oboes, and basso continuo in C major
Andy Akiho, "the rAy's end" for trumpet, violin and tenor pan
Andy Akiho, Six Haikus for trumpet, trombone, bass clarinet, and baritone voice
George Antheil, Symphony for Five Instruments for flute, bassoon, trumpet, trombone and viola
Georges Aperghis, Trio, for flute, clarinet and trumpet
Mark Applebaum, Administocracy for trumpet, trombone, bass clarinet, and baritone voice
Christian Carey, Prayer for trumpet, trombone, bass clarinet, and baritone voice
Shai Cohen, Circles of Time for trumpet and string quartet
Shai Cohen, Encounters for trumpet and Piano
José Ardévol, "Música de Cámera para seis instrumentos" for flute, clarinet, basson, trumpet, violin and cello
Andrew Ardizzola, Distances Between Us for trumpet, saxophone and piano
Georges Auric, Suite for clarinet, bassoon, trumpet, violin, cello and piano, incidental music to Marlborough s'en va-t'en guerre
Johann Sebastian Bach, Brandenburg Concerto No. 2 in F major, BWV 1047
Vykintas Baltakas, RiRo for soprano and trumpet
David Baker, "Hommage a l'Histoire" for clarinet, trumpet trombone, percussion, violin and double bass
Helmut Barbe, "Miniaturen zu dem Lustspiel, Zwei Herren aus Verona" for clarinet, trumpet, trombone, double bass, percussion and piano
Greg Bartholomew, Summer Suite for trumpet and string quartet or sax quartet
Howard Bashaw, New Rage for Now Age for piano, trumpet, trombone, percussion, saxophone
Howard Bashaw, Timepieces for piano, violin, cello, trumpet
Luciano Berio, Kol-Od for trumpet and chamber ensemble
Luciano Berio, Sequenza X for trumpet and piano
Harrison Birtwistle, Hoquetus Petrus for piccolo trumpet and 2 flutes
Walter Blanton, "Variants II" for clarinet, trumpet, violin, double bass, piano, percussion
Heinrich Ignaz Biber, Sonata for trumpet, violin, 2 violas and continuo No. 4 in C major, C. 117
Heinrich Ignaz Biber, Sonata for trumpet, violin, 2 violas and continuo No. 10 in G minor, C. 123
Larry Bitensky, The Other Side concertino for trumpet and chamber ensemble
Anonimo Bolognese, Concerto Op. 4, No. 7 for trumpet, 2 violins, cello and continuo
Oren Boneh, Five Fantasies for trumpet, trombone, bass clarinet, and baritone voice
Henry Brant, Concave for mezzo-soprano, baritone, trumpet, trombone and chamber ensemble
Henry Brant, Wind, Water, Clouds and Fire for jazz trumpet, improv organ, improv marimba, 4 choruses and ensemble
Taylor Brook, Ouaricon Songs, Vol. 2 for trumpet, trombone, bass clarinet, and baritone voice
Howard J. Buss, Contrasts in Blue for trumpet, trombone, and piano
Howard J. Buss, Remembrances for trumpet, cello, and piano
Howard J. Buss, Atmospheres for trumpet/flugelhourn and percussion
Howard J. Buss, Incantation for trumpet and percussion
Christian Carey, A Lady for trumpet and soprano
Christian Carey, Prayer for trumpet, trombone, bass clarinet, and baritone voice
Alfredo Casella, Serenata for clarinet, basson, trumpet, violin, and cello
Alfredo Casella, Sinfonia' for piano, clarinet, trumpet and cello, op. 54
Yves Chardon, Sonata for D trumpet and violincello op. 21
Annick Chartreux, Le 'dit' de L'ombre for trumpet, string quartet, and solo cello
Aldo Clementi, "Studi per Tromba, Violino e Pianoforte"
Ornette Coleman, The Sacred Mind of Johnny Dolphin for double string quartet, trumpet and percussion
Carson P. Cooman, "Chorale and Courante" for trumpet and double bass
Carson P. Cooman, "Lyric Trio" for trumpet, cello and piano
Carson P. Cooman, Quintet for trumpet and strings
Carson P. Cooman, "Sun Songs" for trumpet and violin
Carson P. Cooman, "Un Regard Eloigne" for flugelhorn and cello
Arcangelo Corelli, Sonata in D major for trumpet, 2 violins and continuo
Gyula Csapó, Handshake after Shot for two muted trumpets, oboe, electric organ and suspended cardboard box
Chaya Czernowin, IRRATIONAL for trumpet, trombone, bass clarinet, and baritone voice
Peter Maxwell Davies, Quintet for trumpet and string quartet
Vincent d'Indy, Suite in Olden Style for two flutes, trumpet, 2 violins, viola, cello, op. 24
Jonathan Dawe, A Ship of Fools for trumpet, trombone, bass clarinet, and baritone voice
Rob Deemer, Thalia Fields for flugelhorn and soprano
Nick Didkovsky, Firm, soapy hothead for trumpet, trombone, bass clarinet, and baritone voice
Brett William Dietz, Atomic Cocktail for trumpet and violin
Axel Dörner, Komposition für streichquartett und trompete
Amy Dunker, Etesian Traveller for trumpet, vibraphone and piano
Amy Dunker, White Moon for trumpet and clarinet
Ty Emerson, Quartet No. 2 for flute, trumpet, cello and percussion
Donald Erb, Dance Pieces for violin, piano, trumpet and percussion
Robert Erickson, Night Music
Thierry Escaich, Antiennes oubliées for violin, cello, flute, saxophone, trumpet, trombone and percussion
Thierry Escaich, Élégie for trumpet and instrumental ensemble
Eric Ewazen, "Mandala", for flute, clarinet, trumpet, violin, and cello
Eric Ewazen, Quintet for trumpet and strings
Eric Ewazen, Trio for trumpet, cello (viola, trombone or flute), and piano
Eric Ewazen, Trio In E-flat for trumpet, violin and piano
Mohammed Fairouz, Meditation for alto saxophone, trumpet, and amplified double bass
Mohammed Fairouz, Three Shakespeare Songs for clarinet, bassoon, trumpet, trombone, harp, mezzo soprano, violin, double bass
Lorenzo Ferrero, Freedom Variations for trumpet and chamber ensemble
David Franzson, Longitudinal Study #1 for trumpet, trombone, bass clarinet, and baritone voice
Reiko Füting, eternal return (Passacaglia) for trumpet and soprano
Reiko Füting, Land of Silence for trumpet, trombone, bass clarinet, and baritone voice
Reiko Füting, mo(nu)ment for C for trumpet, trombone, bass clarinet, and baritone voice
Jeffrey Gavett, Musicorum et Cantorum for trumpet, trombone, bass clarinet, and baritone voice
Jeffrey Gavett, Proof of Concept for Floating Child for trumpet and soprano
Robert Gilliam, Trio for violin, trumpet and cello
David Gillingham, ‘’Tourbilion, Whirlwind’’ trio for violin, trumpet and piano
Alexei Haieff, "Dance Suite: Princess Zondilda and her Entourage" for flute, bassoon, trumpet, violin, cello and piano
Richard Halligan, Dialogues, for trumpet, piano and percussion
Gilles Herbillion, "Arban" for trumpet, cello and piano
Gilles Herbillion, "Elegie" for trumpet and cello
Paul Hindemith, "Drei Stücke" for clarinet, trumpet, violin, double bass and piano
Paul Hindemith, "Tafelmusik" for flute, two trumpets, violin, and cello
Johann Nepomuk Hummel, Septett Militaire in C major for piano, flute, violin, clarinet, cello, trumpet and double bass, op. 114
Charles Ives, "Allegretto Sombreoso" for flute, trumpet, three violins, and piano
Charles Ives, "Fugue in Four Keys on the Shining Shore" for flute, trumpet, two violins, viola, cello and double bass
Charles Ives, "Scherzo (all the way around and back)" for flute, trumpet, violin, piano and percussion
Evan Johnson, my pouert and going ouer for trumpet, trombone, bass clarinet, and baritone voice
Vincent A. Jockin, Quintet, Op. 27, No. 1, for trumpet and string quartet
André Jolivet, Heptade for trumpet and percussion
André Jolivet, 12 Inventions for wind quintet, trumpet, trombone, and string quintet
Susan Kander, "Two Tricky Tales, for narrator, clarinet, trumpet, percussion, violin and cello
Finnur Karlsson, Happy, happy hell in that they for trumpet, trombone, bass clarinet, and baritone voice
Jan Koetsier, "Duo Giocoso" for trumpet and viola
Jo Kondo, "Durante l'Inverno"
Andy Kozar, On the End and Being Forgotten for trumpet(s) and electric guitar
Andy Kozar, Mass for trumpet, trombone, bass clarinet, and baritone voice
Andy Kozar, To Keep My Loneliness Warm for trumpet, trombone, bass clarinet, and baritone voice
György Kurtag, "Rücklick" for trumpet double bass and two pianos
William Lang, Sciarrino Songs for trumpet, trombone, bass clarinet, and baritone voice
Hannah Lash, Music for Eight Lungs for trumpet, trombone, bass clarinet, and baritone voice
Hannah Lash, Stoned Prince for trumpet, trombone, bass clarinet, and baritone voice
Hannah Lash, The Shepherdess and the Chimney Sweep for trumpet, trombone, bass clarinet, baritone voice, and harp
George Lewis, Apis for trumpet, trombone, bass clarinet, and baritone voice
Lei Liang, Lakescape V for trumpet, trombone, bass clarinet, and baritone voice
Liza Lim, Ehwaz for trumpet and percussion
Liza Lim, Songs Found in Dream for oboe, clarinet, saxophone, trumpet, 2 percussionists, cello and bass
Liza Lim, Veil for flute, clarinet, trumpet, percussion, piano, violin, and cello
Alexandre Lunsqui, Guttural I-IV for trumpet, trombone, bass clarinet, and baritone voice
Alexandre Lunsqui, Solis for trumpet and soprano
Keeril Makan, Becoming Unknown for flute/bass flute, clarinet in a/bass clarinet, trumpet, double bass
Yan Maresz, Metallics for solo trumpet and ensemble
Jonathan Marmor, Monitor for flute, trumpet, horn and 7 synthesizers
Bohuslav Martinů, "La Revue de Cuisine" for clarinet, bassoon, trumpet, violin, cello and piano
Alessandro Melani, Cantata "All'armi, pensieri" for soprano, trumpet, cello and continuo
Alessandro Melani, Cantata "Quai bellici accenti" for soprano, trumpet, cello and continuo
Darius Milhaud, Hécube incidental music for flute, clarinet, bassoon, trumpet and percussion, Op. 177
Darius Milhaud, Jules César, incidental music for flute, clarinet (or saxophone), trumpet, tuba and percussion, Op. 158
Darius Milhaud, Macbeth incidental music for flute, clarinet, bassoon, violin, cello, trumpet and percussion, op. 175
Alex Mincek, Number May Be Defined for trumpet, trombone, bass clarinet, and baritone voice
Alex Mincek, Poco a Poco for flute, clarinet, trumpet, piano, violin, viola, cello
Erik Morales, "Passion Dance"
Frederick Naftel, "Broken Consort" for trumpet, trombone, violin and viola
Václav Nelhýbel, "Quintetto Concertante" for trumpet, trombone, violin, xylophone and piano
Maria Newman, Kestrel and Leonardo for trumpet and viola
Ketty Nez, contour(t) for trumpet, marimba and vibraphone
Juhani Nuorvala, "Twitching Gait" for flute, clarinet, trumpet, violin and cello
Leroy Osmon, Concerto for trumpet, winds and percussion
Leroy Osmon, Concertino for trumpet, cello and 8 percussionists
Leroy Osmon, Sonatina for trumpet and viola
Bryan Page, Variations on a Theme by Jack for cornet and guitar
John Payne, "Quartet" for alto saxophone, trumpet, viola and double bass
Larry Polansky, lissatoods for trumpet, voice, percussion and harmonic instrument
Francis Poulenc, Quatre poèmes de Max Jacob for voice, flute, oboe, bassoon, trumpet and violin
Francis Poulenc, Suite française for 2 oboes, 2 bassoons, 2 trumpets, 3 trombones, percussion and harpsichord
Prentzl, Sonata for trumpet, bassoon and continuo
William Presser, "Three Duets" for trumpet and double bass
Augusto Rattenbach, Serenata for flute, clarinet, trumpet and cello
Eric Richards, Fire, fire! for trumpet, trombone, bass clarinet, and baritone voice
Brandon Ridenour, Music for Trumpet and Djembe
Scott Robins, "Three Blues" for trumpet and cello
David Rosenboom, Trio for clarinet, trumpet and bass
David Rothenberg, Trio for clarinet, trumpet and cello
Frederic Rzewski, Trio for flute, trumpet and piano
Camille Saint-Saëns, Septet for trumpet, string quartet, double bass and piano, op. 65
David Sampson, Passage for viola and flugelhorn
David Sampson, Three Sides for trumpet, vibraphone and piano
Alessandro Scarlatti, Cantata "Su le sponde del Tebro" for soprano, trumpet, 2 violins, cello and basso continuo
Peter Schat, "Due Pezzi" for flute, trumpet, violin, and percussion
Peter Schickele, "Music for Judy", for trumpet and string quartet
Karl Schiske, Musik für Klarinette, Trompete und Bratsche
Daniel Schnyder 'ARABESQUE' for tp and 2 percussionists
Daniel Schnyder "Iron Tetrapod" for 2tp horn and tb
Daniel Schnyder "EUPHORIA" for brass quintet and clarinet or soprano sax 
William Schmidt, "Jazzberries" for trumpet, cello and piano
Dieter Schnebel, HD for trumpet and 9 Harley-Davidsons
Ruth Schönthal, "Trompetengesänge" for trumpet, mezzo soprano, violin, cello, piano and percussion
Adam Schoenberg, Ailtyud for flute, clarinet, bassoon, alto saxophone, and trumpet
Elliot Schwartz, "Music" for oboe, trumpet and cello
Elliott Schwartz, Sinfonia Juxta for 2 trumpets, piano and percussion
Charlotte Seither, Waiting for T for trumpet, trombone, percussion and violoncello
Alex Shapiro, Elegy for trumpet, cello, and piano
Roberto Sierra, "Piezas Caracteristicas" for bass clarinet, trumpet, violin, cello, percussion and piano
David Smooke, A Baby Bigger Grows Than Up Was for trumpet, trombone, bass clarinet, and baritone voice
David Smooke, All Are Welcome for trumpet and soprano
Heather Stebbins, Quiver for trumpet, trombone, bass clarinet, and baritone voice
Thomas Stevens, Variations on Clifford Intervals for trumpet, vibraphone and bass
James Stephenson, Croatian Trio for flute (clarinet), trumpet and piano
James Stephenson, "Thinking" for clarinet, bassoon, trumpet, violin, cello and piano
James Stephenson, Trio Sonata for violin (or flute), trumpet and piano
James Stephenson, La Viaggio Vita for violin (or flute), trumpet and piano
James Stephenson, Walk Slowly for trumpet, soprano and piano
Karlheinz Stockhausen, Bassetsu Trio for basset horn, trumpet, and trombone
Karlheinz Stockhausen, Erwachen for soprano saxophone, trumpet, and cello
Karlheinz Stockhausen, Glanz for oboe, clarinet, bassoon, trumpet, trombone, tuba, and viola
Karlheinz Stockhausen, Halt for trumpet and double bass
Karlheinz Stockhausen, Quitt for alto flute, bassethorn, and piccolo trumpet
Karlheinz Stockhausen, Schönheit for flute, bass clarinet, and trumpet
Karlheinz Stockhausen, Tierkreis Trio for trumpet/piano, flute/piccolo, and clarinet/bassethorn
Karlheinz Stockhausen, Vision for trumpet, tenor, mime, and synthesizer
Wolfgang Stockmeien, Reaktionen Wk 145 for flute, oboe, trumpet, violin, cello and piano
Alessandro Stradella, Sinfonia alla Serenata "Il Barcheggio" for trumpet, 2 violins, cello and continuo
Alessandro Stradella, Sonata a 8 Viole con una Tromba in D major
Igor Stravinsky, Histoire du Soldat for clarinet, bassoon, cornet, trombone, violin, double bass and percussion
Igor Stravinsky, Octet for flute, clarinet, two bassoons, two trumpets, and two trombones
Gerhard Sturany, Duo Op. 1 for trumpet and violin
Carlos Surinach, Hollywood Carnival, Sketches in Cartoon for flute, clarinet, trumpet, double bass and percussion
William Sydeman, Duo for trumpet and amplified double bass
William Sydeman, Quartet for clarinet, trumpet, violin and double bass
Mark Alan Taggart, "Song at Sunset" for trumpet and string quartet
Alexandre Tansman, Divertimento for oboe, clarinet, trumpet, cello and piano
Georg Philipp Telemann, Air for trumpet and continuo in D, TWV41:C1
Georg Philipp Telemann, Quartet for trumpet, 2 oboes and continuo in D, TWV43:D7
Georg Philipp Telemann, Quintet for trumpet, violins, viola and continuo in D, TWV44:1
Georg Philipp Telemann, Sinfonia Spirituosa in D Major (2 violins, viola and continuo, trumpet ad libitum)
László Tihanyi, L’épitaphe du soldat for clarinet, bassoon, trumpet, trombone, percussion, violin and bass
Virgil Thomson,Sonata da Chiesa for E-flat clarinet, trumpet, French horn, trombone, and viola
Antoine Tisne, "Strates Colorees" for oboe, English horn, trumpet, trombone and viola
Giuseppe Torelli, Sonata for strings and trumpet
Manos Tsangaris, Tafel 3 for trumpet/zugtrompete/quarter-tone flugelhorn/piccolo, soprano, percussion and noise generator (four players in a tree)
Edgard Varèse, Octandre for seven wind instruments and double bass
Massimiliano Viel, "Pulsars in M5" for trumpet, brass trio, string quartet and electronic sounds
Kevin Volans, "Trumpet and String Quartet No. 1"
Kevin Volans, "Trumpet and String Quartet No. 2"
André Waignein, Brass Spectacular for ten instruments
Anton Webern, "Fünf Geistliche Lieder" for flute, clarinet, trumpet, harp, violin and soprano
Paul Wehage, "Idylle" for trumpet, two violins, viola, cello and organ
Natalie Williams, Lullaby for brass ensemble, percussion and 2 cellos
Christian Wolff, Boras Song for horn, trumpet, violin and piano
Christian Wolff, Duo 6 for trumpet and violin
Christian Wolff, For six or seven players (= Music for Merce Cunningham) for violin, viola, trumpet, trombone, piano and bass
Christian Wolff, Mosaic Trio for trumpet, violin and piano
Christian Wolff, Nine for flute, clarinet, horn, trumpet, trombone, celeste, piano and two cellos
Christian Wolff, Pulse for trumpet and percussion
Christian Wolff, Trio for flute, trumpet and cello
Christian Wolff, Variation for trumpet, percussion and bass with sound projection
Scott Wollschleger, Bring Something Incomprehensible Into This World for trumpet and soprano
Scott Wollschleger, What Is The Word for trumpet, trombone, bass clarinet, and baritone voice
Stefan Wolpe, Piece for Trumpet and Seven Instruments
Stefan Wolpe, Quartet for trumpet, tenor saxophone, percussion and piano
Scott Worthington, Infinitive for trumpet, trombone, bass clarinet, and baritone voice
Scott Worthington, SILENCE (every spell is muted) for trumpet and soprano
Charles Wuorinen, Alphabetical Ashbery for trumpet, trombone, bass clarinet, and baritone voice
Roly Berger Yttrehus, Sextet for French horn, trumpet, percussion, piano, violin and double bass

Trumpet and orchestra

Michael Abels, American Variations on "Swing Low, Sweet Chariot"
John Adams, Tromba Iontana for two trumpets and orchestra
John Addison, Concerto for trumpet, strings and percussion (1958)
Tomaso Albinoni, Sonata a sei con tromba in C major (for trumpet, 2 violins, 2 violas and basso continuo)
Tomaso Albinoni, Sinfonia in D major for the first act of Zenobia (for trumpet, 2 violins, 2 violas, cello and basso continuo)
Tomaso Albinoni, "Vien con nuova orribil guerra" from La Statira for soprano, 2 trumpets, 2 oboes, strings and continuo
Boris Alexandrov, Concerto for trumpet and orchestra
Leroy Anderson, A Trumpeter's Lullaby
Iosif Andriasov, Concertino for trumpet and orchestra, Op. 14
Iosif Andriasov, Passacaglia for trumpet, trombone and string orchestra, Op. 22
Iosif Andriasov, Musical Sketch for trumpet and chamber orchestra, Op. 23a
Malcolm Arnold, Trumpet Concerto
Richard Ayres, No. 31 (NONcerto for trumpet)
Alexander Arutiunian, Trumpet Concerto in A-flat major (1950)
Vazha Azarashvili, Concerto for trumpet and orchestra
Aziz Azizov, Concerto for trumpet and orchestra
Nicolas Bacri, Concerto Episodes for trumpet and orchestra
Valentinas Bagdonas, Concerto for trumpet and orchestra
Gennady Banshchikov, Concertino for trumpet and orchestra
Henry Barraud, Symphonie concertante, for trumpet and orchestra
Greg Bartholomew, Summer Suite for trumpet and chamber orchestra or string orchestra
Nicholas Berdiev, Concerto No. 1 for trumpet and orchestra
Nicholas Berdiev, Concerto No. 2 for trumpet and orchestra
Nicholas Berdiev, Concerto No. 3 for trumpet and orchestra
Nicholas Berdiev, Concerto No. 4 for trumpet and orchestra
Luciano Berio, Kol-Od (Chemins VI)
Lauren Bernofsky, Concerto for trumpet and orchestra (1998)
Harrison Birtwistle, Endless Parade, for trumpet, vibraphone and strings
B. Blagovidov, Concerto for trumpet and orchestra
Herbert Blendinger, Concerto barocco for trumpet and orchestra (1977)
Ernest Bloch, Proclamation
Ya Bobokhidze, Concerto for trumpet and orchestra
I. Bobrovski, Concerto for trumpet
Oskar Böhme, Concerto for Trumpet, Op. 18
Sergei Bolotin, Concerto for trumpet and orchestra
Yevgeny Brusilovsky, Concerto for trumpet and orchestra
Howard J. Buss, Skylines for trumpet and orchestra
Dimitrije Bužarovski, Concerto for trumpet and strings Op. 58
Charles Chaynes, Trumpet Concerto No. 1
Charles Chaynes, Trumpet Concerto No. 2
Chen-Bao, Concerto for trumpet
Domenico Cimarosa, Trumpet Concerto in C Major (transcribed from Oboe Concerto)
Jeremiah Clarke, Suite in D
Aaron Copland, Quiet City for trumpet, English horn and strings
Joseph Curiale, Blue Windows
Peter Maxwell Davies, Trumpet Concerto
Peter Maxwell Davies, Strathclyde Concerto No. 3, for horn, trumpet, and orchestra
Tansy Davies, Spiral House for trumpet and orchestra
Alfred Desenclos, Incantation, Threne et Danse
B. Domoratzky, Concerto for trumpet and piano
Nikolay Dremliuga, Concerto for trumpet and orchestra
Joe Drew, Haydn's Retrofitted Trumpet Concerto
Enke, Concerto for trumpet
Péter Eötvös, Jet Stream
Péter Eötvös, Snatches of a Conversation, for double-bell trumpet, speaker, and ensemble
Thierry Escaich, Résurgences for trumpet and orchestra
N. Evstratov, Concerto for trumpet
Harold Farberman, Double Concerto for Single Trumpet
Johann Friedrich Fasch, Trumpet Concerto in D Major, FWV L:D1
Leonid Feigin, Concerto for trumpet and orchestra
Grigory Feldman, Concerto for trumpet
Lorenzo Ferrero, Two Cathedrals in the South, concertino for trumpet and string orchestra
Ron Ford, Gabriel
Petronio Franceschini, Sonata in D major for 2 trumpets, strings and continuo
Luca Francesconi, Hard Pace, for trumpet and orchestra
Baldassare Galuppi, Alla tromba della Fama for soprano, trumpet, strings and continuo
A. Geifman, Concerto for trumpet
Michael Gilbertson (composer),  Concerto for trumpet and orchestra
Alexander Goedicke, Concert Etude for Trumpet and Orchestra, Op. 49
Vadim Gomoliaka, Concerto for trumpet
Edward Gregson, Concerto for Trumpet, Strings and Timpani
Joseph Arnold Gross, Trumpet Concerto in D major
HK Gruber, Aerial
Joachim Gruner, Concerto for Trumpet and Orchestra No. 1
Rashid Gubaidullina, Concerto for trumpet
Robert Lewis Hall, Concerto for string orchestra, four trumpets, keyboard and harp
Iain Hamilton, Circus for two trumpets and orchestra
George Frideric Handel,  Overture to "Atalanta" for trumpet and orchestra
George Frideric Handel, Trumpet Concerto No. 9 in B-flat Major
George Frideric Handel, Mr. Handel's Celebrated Water Piece, for trumpet and strings
Joseph Haydn, Trumpet Concerto in E flat major
Michael Haydn, Trumpet Concerto in C major, MH 60
Michael Haydn, Trumpet Concerto in D major, MH 104
Bernhard Heiden, Concerto Music for trumpet and orchestra
Piers Hellawell, Cors de chasse, for trumpet, trombone, and orchestra
Hans Werner Henze, Requiem
Johann Wilhelm Hertel, Double Concerto in E-flat Major for trumpet and oboe
Jacques Hétu, Concerto for trumpet and small orchestra, Op. 43
Arthur Honegger, Symphony No. 2 for strings and trumpet
Alan Hovhaness, Prayer of St. Gregory, Op. 62b, for B-flat trumpet and strings (or organ)
Johann Nepomuk Hummel, Trumpet Concerto in E major
Charles Ives, The Unanswered Question for trumpet and orchestra
B. Iarovinskii, Concerto for trumpet
Leonid Israelevich, Concert-Poem for trumpet and orchestra
André Jolivet, Concertino for Trumpet, Strings and Piano
André Jolivet, Trumpet Concerto No. 2
Jan Kapr, Omaggio alla Tromba for 2 trumpets and orchestra
Sabir Karim-Khodzhi, Concerto No. 1 for trumpet and orchestra
Sabir Karim-Khodzhi, Concerto No. 2 for trumpet and orchestra
Lev Kogan, Concerto for trumpet
Lev Kolodub, Concerto for trumpet and orchestra
Tomas Korganov, Concerto for trumpet, Op. 21
Peter Jona Korn, Concerto for trumpet
Aleksandr Krasotov, Concerto for trumpet and orchestra
Vladimir Kriukov, Concerto-poem, Opus 59, for trumpet and orchestra
Hanna Kulenty, Trumpet Concerto
Kuddus Kuzhamiarov, Concerto for trumpet and orchestra
Raoul Laparra, Suite Italienne
Yakov Lapinskii, Concerto for trumpet and orchestra
I. Lapshan, Concerto for trumpet
William Latham, Suite for trumpet and orchestra
Svetlana Leonchik, Concerto for trumpet and orchestra
I. Leonov, Concerto for trumpet
Lowell Liebermann, Concerto for Trumpet and Orchestra, Op. 64
A. Luppov, Concerto for trumpet
James MacMillan, Epiclesis
Leo Mal'ter, Concertino for trumpet
Al'bert Markov, Concertino for trumpet
Frank Martin, Concerto for seven wind instruments, timpani, percussion, and string orchestra (1949)
Georges Marty, Choral for trumpet and orchestra
Martín Matalon, Trame V
Jekabs Medin, Concerto for trumpet
Darius Milhaud, Symphonie concertante for bassoon, horn, trumpet, double bass and orchestra, Op.376
Darius Milhaud, La couronne de gloire, Cantata for voice and chamber ensemble (flute, trumpet, strings), Op. 211
Johann Molter, Trumpet Concerto No. 1 in D
O. Moralev, Concertino for trumpet
Paul Moravec, Songs of Love and War for baritone, trumpet, chorus and strings
Leopold Mozart, Trumpet Concerto in D major
Aleksandr Mulyar, Concerto for trumpet
Timur Mynbaev, Concerto for trumpet
Johann Baptist Georg Neruda, Concerto in E-flat for Trumpet and Strings
Arkady Nesterov, Concerto for trumpet and orchestra
Olga Neuwirth, ... miramondo multiplo..., for C and piccolo trumpets and orchestra
Christopher Norton, Concertino for trumpet and strings
Chari Nurymov, Concerto for trumpet and orchestra
Sean O'Boyle, Lonseome Prairie
D. Osinovskii, Concerto for trumpet
Leroy Osmon, Ballad for trumpet, piano and strings
Alexandria Pakhmutova, Concerto for trumpet and orchestra
Fabian Panisello, Trumpet Concerto
Andrzej Panufnik, Concerto in modo antico for trumpet, 2 harps, harpsichord, and strings
Arvo Pärt, Concerto Piccolo über B-A-C-H for trumpet, strings, harpsichord and piano
Stephen Paulus, Concerto for Two Trumpets and Orchestra
 Giacomo Antonio Perti, Sinfonia to 'L'Inganno scoperto per Vendetta' (1691) for trumpet, strings and basso continuo
Vladimir Peskin, Concerto No. 1 for trumpet
Vladimir Peskin, Concerto No. 2 for trumpet
Vladimir Peskin, Concerto No. 3 for trumpet
Matthias Pintscher, Celestial Object I for trumpet and ensemble
Matthias Pintscher, Occultation for solo horn, solo trumpet and ensemble
Anthony Plog, Trumpet Concerto no. 1
Amilcare Ponchielli, Trumpet Concerto in F major
Gerhard Präsent Himmelslicht concerto for trumpet and orchestra
Gene Pritsker, Sonnets for trumpet and string orchestra
Henry Purcell, Sonata, Trumpet and Strings Z.850
Yerkegali Rakhmadiev, Concerto for trumpet and orchestra
Samuil Ratner, Concerto for trumpet
Franz Richter, Trumpet Concerto in D Major
Wolfgang Rihm, Marsyas Rhapsody for Trumpet, Percussion & Orchestra
Vivian Adelberg Rudow, Dark Waters
Aulis Sallinen, Sunrise Serenade Op. 63, 2 trumpets, piano and string orchestra
David Sampson, Serenade for flugelhorn and orchestra
David Sampson, Triptych for trumpet and orchestra
R. Murray Schafer, The Falcon's Trumpet
Daniel Schnyder Concerto for Trumpet and Orchestra
Il'ya Shakhov, Romantic Concerto
Rodion Konstantinovich Shchedrin, Concerto for trumpet and orchestra
Vyacheslav Shchelokov, Concerto No. 1 for trumpet and orchestra
Vyacheslav Shchelokov, Concerto No. 2 for trumpet and orchestra
Vyacheslav Shchelokov, Concerto No. 3 for trumpet and orchestra
Vyacheslav Shchelokov, Concerto, "Children's Concerto" for trumpet and orchestra
Yuri Shchurovskii, Concerto for trumpet
Dmitri Shostakovich, Concerto in C minor for piano, trumpet, and string orchestra, Op. 35
Nikolay Silvanskii, Concerto for trumpet and orchestra
Antonio Spadavecchia, Concerto for trumpet and orchestra
James Stephenson, Concerto No. 1 for trumpet and orchestra
James Stephenson, Cousins for trumpet, saxophone and orchestra
James Stephenson, Rextreme: Concerto No. 2 for trumpet and orchestra
James Stephenson, The Russian Concerto for trumpet, piano and string orchestra
James Stephenson, Tribute to Louis Armstrong for trumpet and orchestra
Karlheinz Stockhausen, Michaels Reise um die Erde for trumpet and orchestra
Simon Stockhausen, Windschatten for flugelhorn, orchestra and electronics
Gottfried Heinrich Stölzel, Concerto for trumpet in D
R. Svirskii, Concertino for trumpet
Germaine Tailleferre, Sinfonietta for trumpet, strings and tympani
Otar Taktakishvili, Concerto for trumpet and orchestra
Eino Tamberg, Concerto for trumpet and orchestra
Giuseppe Tartini, Trumpet Concerto in D
Georg Philipp Telemann, Trumpet Concerto No. 1 in D Major TWV51:D7
Georg Philipp Telemann, Concerto for 2 oboes and trumpet in D Major TWV 53:D2
Georg Philipp Telemann, Sonata for trumpet and strings in D Major, TWV 41:DA3 also known as Quintet for trumpet, violins, viola and continuo in D, TWV44:1
Georg Philipp Telemann, Trumpet Concerto in C Minor (Oboe concerto transcribed by M. Andre) TWV51:c1
Otar Tevtoradze,'Concerto for trumpet
Henri Tomasi, Concerto for trumpet and orchestra
Giuseppe Torelli, Sinfonia con tromba
Giuseppe Torelli, Trumpet Concerto in D Major
Bogdon Trotsiuk, Concert-Symphony for trumpet
Rezvan Tsorionti, Concerto for trumpet
Vladimir Tsybin, Concerto for trumpet and orchestra
Fisher Tull, Rhapsody for trumpet and orchestra
Mark-Anthony Turnage, From the Wreckage
Mark-Anthony Turnage, Dispelling the Fears for two trumpets and orchestra
Joseph Turrin, Concerto for trumpet and orchestra
Moisei Vainberg, Concerto for trumpet and orchestra, op. 95
Sergei Vasilenko, Concerto for trumpet and orchestra, op. 113
A. Vasilev-Aslamas, Concerto Rhapsody for trumpet
Antonio Vivaldi, Concerto for two trumpets and strings in C major, RV 537
Antonio Vivaldi, "Combatta un gentil cor" from Tito Manlio for soprano, trumpet, strings and continuo RV 738
Michael Blake Watkins, Trumpet Concerto
Mieczyslaw Weinberg, Concerto for Trumpet and Orchestra, Op. 94
John Williams, Trumpet Concerto
Joe Wolfe, Trumpet concerto
Luigi Zaninelli, Aria festiva for trumpet, trumpet choir and orchestra
Luigi Zaninelli, Autumn Music, for trumpet and strings
Marc'Antonio Ziani, "Trombe d'Ausonia" from La Flora for soprano, trumpet and continuo
Bernd Alois Zimmermann, Nobody Knows De Trouble I See, for trumpet and orchestra

Trumpet and wind ensemble

Mary Jeanne van Appledorn, Concerto for trumpet and band
Richard Rodney Bennett, Concerto for trumpet and wind orchestra
Jerry Bilik, Concerto for trumpet and band
Larry Bitensky, Awake You Sleepers for trumpet and wind ensemble
Larry Bitensky, The Closing of the Gates for trumpet and wind ensemble
Jeffrey Boehm, Homage for Dave and Dolly for trumpet and wind band
Henry Brant, Concerto for alto saxophone or trumpet and nine instruments
Timothy Broege, Concert Piece for trumpet and band
Robert Farnon, Blow the Wind Southerly for trumpet and wind symphony
Jean Françaix, Le Gai Paris for trumpet and orchestral wind ensemble
David Gillingham, When Speaks the Signal Trumpet-Tone for trumpet, flugelhorn, piccolo trumpet and wind ensemble
Stephen Gryc, Evensong for trumpet and wind ensemble
Daron Hagen, Concerto for flugelhorn and wind ensemble
Walter Hartley, Concertino for trumpet and wind ensemble
Alan Hovhaness, Return and Rebuild the Desolate Places for trumpet and wind orchestra
Karel Husa, Concerto for trumpet and wind orchestra
William Latham, Fantasy for trumpet and wind ensemble
Peter Lawrence, Dialogue for trumpet, cornet and wind band
Istvan Lendvay, Concerto for trumpet and wind orchestra
Jukka Linkola, Tango-Tarantella for trumpet and symphonic band
William Linn, Concerto Grosso for brass trio and winds
John Mackey, Antique Violences: Concerto for Trumpet with winds, brass, and percussion
Martin Mailman, Concertino for trumpet and band
Leroy Osmon, "Concerto for Trumpet, Winds and Percussion"
Andrei Petrov, Concerto for trumpet and wind orchestra
Daniel Pinkham, Serenades for solo trumpet and wind ensemble
Alfred Reed, Concerto for trumpet and winds
Jerzy Sapieyevski, Concerto for trumpet and winds
Hale Smith, Exchanges for trumpet and band
James Stephenson, August in York for solo trumpet and concert band
James Stephenson, Duo Fantastique for two solo trumpet and concert band
James Stephenson, Queen of the Night Aria for piccolo trumpet and concert band
Fisher Tull, Rhapsody for trumpet and winds
Joseph Turrin, Chronicles for trumpet and wind orchestra
Joseph Turrin, Fandango for trumpet, trombone and wind band
Joseph Turrin, The Sounding of the Call for trumpet and wind ensemble
Floyd Werle, Concertos No. 1-4 for trumpet and band
Maurice Whitney, Concertino for trumpet and concert band
Alec Wilder, Concerto No. 1 for trumpet and wind ensemble
Alec Wilder, Concerto No. 2 for trumpet, flugelhorn and wind ensemble
Thorstein Wollmann, Concerto for jazz-trumpet and symphonic band

Electroacoustic

Eve Beglarian, Island of the Sirens for trumpet, trombone, bass clarinet, baritone voice, and electronics
Christopher Biggs, "Decoherence" for trumpet and computer (2014)
Jeffrey Boehm, Dresden Abandoned for trumpet and live electronics
Jeffrey Boehm, Ovid's Dream for trumpet and live electronics
Jeffrey Boehm, Reflections of Sherrie for trumpet and live electronics
Peter Burt, Auf dem Wasser zu spielen for trumpet, tape and live electronics
Howard J. Buss, "Alien Loop de Loops" for trumpet and electronic recording (fixed media) Brixton Publications
Christopher Cerrone, How to Breathe Underwater for male voice, bass clarinet, trumpet, trombone, pre-recorded electronics
Quinn Collins, Blister for trumpet and tape
Quinn Collins, Nervous Aluminum Rabbit for trumpet, trombone, bass clarinet, baritone voice, and electronics
Chris Cresswell, all that's left is dirt and sky for trumpet, soprano, and electronics
Charles Dodge, Extensions for trumpet and tape
Joseph Drew, I Blur Noel for quarter-tone flugelhorn and tape
Aaron Einbond, Central Park for trumpet, trombone, bass clarinet, baritone voice, and electronics
Eli Fieldsteel, "Fractus I" for trumpet and SuperCollider (2010, rev. 2012)
David Franzson, Longitudinal Study #1 for trumpet and electronics
Jeffrey Gavett, Moving Target for trumpet and electronics
John Gibson, "Out of Hand" for trumpet, trombone, and computer (2008)
Tyler Harrison, Flutter for trumpet and electronics
Jonathan Harvey, Ricarcare una Melodia for trumpet and tape-delay system
William Hellermann, Passages 13-The Fire for trumpet and tape
Eres Holz, 6 Mosaik Inventionen for trumpet, piano and live-electronics (2004)
richard johnson, "Introit" for trumpet, electronics, and video (2011)
Jouni Kaipainen, Altaforte, op. 18
Mary Kouyoumdjian, Where Once for trumpet, trombone, bass clarinet, baritone voice, and electronics
Yannis Kyriakides, Dog Song (Cerberus serenades Orpheus) for double-bell trumpet, soundtrack and computer
Hannah Lash, Secrets for trumpet and tape
Henri Lazarof, Concertazioni for trumpet, 6 instruments and 4-channel tape
Claus-Steffen Mahnkopf, 432 Park Ave. for trumpet, trombone, bass clarinet, baritone voice, and electronics
Ryan Manchester, Tattva for trumpet and tape
Yan Maresz, Metallics for trumpet and electronics
Paula Matthusen, old fires catch old buildings for trumpet, trombone, bass clarinet, baritone voice, and electronics
Paula Matthusen, on the imagined relations of night sounds (and silent darkness) for trumpet and electronics
Ted Moore, fiery walls for trumpet and SuperCollider
Angélica Negrón, dóabin for trumpet, trombone, bass clarinet, baritone voice, and electronics
Olga Neuwirth, Addio...sognando for trumpet and tape
Tae Hong Park, t1 for trumpet and tape
 Andrew Powell, Plasmogeny II for trumpet, live electronics and tape
Roger Reynolds, The Serpent-Snapping Eye for trumpet, percussion, piano and tape
David Sampson, Breakaway for 2 trumpets and electronics
Annette Schlünz, Copeaux, éclisses for oboe, bass clarinet, trumpet, cello and electronics
Elliott Schwartz, Music for Napoleon and Beethoven for trumpet, piano and 2 tapes
 Roger Smalley, Echo III for trumpet with tape delay
Heather Stebbins, Tracer for trumpet and electronics
Karlheinz Stockhausen, Aries for C trumpet and tape
Karlheinz Stockhausen, Pietà for quarter-tone flugelhorn, soprano and tape
Karlheinz Stockhausen, Trompete for C trumpet and tape
Bernd Thewes, Koko for trumpet and tape (text by Hugo Ball)
Ken Ueno, Quentin for trumpet and electronics
Skye van Duuren, Thoughts on the Death of a Tree for flugelhorn and electronics (2020)
Aurelio de la Vega, Para-Tangents for trumpet and pre-recorded sounds
 Massimiliano Viel, Pulsars for trumpet and electronic sounds
Samuel Wells, "(dys)functions" for trumpet and electronics (2011)
Samuel Wells, "minong" for piccolo trumpet, live electronics, and video (2012)
 Robert Wieck, Eluxée for trumpet, four-track tape and live electronics
Scott Worthington, A Different Infiniteness for trumpet, trombone, bass clarinet, baritone voice, and electronics
Scott Worthington, A Few Kites for trumpet, violin, and electronics
Scott Worthington, Still Life for trumpet and electronics

Theatrical roles
Karlheinz Stockhausen, Donnerstag aus Licht (Michael)
Karlheinz Stockhausen, Samstag aus Licht (Michael)
Karlheinz Stockhausen, Dienstag aus Licht (Michael)
Karlheinz Stockhausen, Sonntag aus Licht (Michael)
Isabel Mundry, Ein Atemzug – die Odyssee (Odysseus)

Famous orchestral excerpts
Johann Sebastian Bach, Magnificat
Béla Bartók, Concerto for Orchestra (Bartók)
Ludwig van Beethoven, Leonore Overture No. 2
Ludwig van Beethoven, Leonore Overture No. 3
George Frideric Handel, Messiah
Gustav Mahler, Symphony No. 3
Gustav Mahler, Symphony No. 5
Modest Mussorgsky, Pictures at an Exhibition (orch. Ravel)
Maurice Ravel, Piano Concerto in G
Ottorino Respighi, Pines of Rome
Nikolai Rimsky-Korsakov, Scheherazade
Alexander Scriabin, The Poem of Ecstasy
Richard Strauss, Ein Heldenleben
Richard Strauss, Don Juan
Igor Stravinsky, Petrushka
Richard Wagner, Parsifal

References
Gilreath, Amy. "A Bibliography of Trumpet Concertos from the Former Soviet Union", Journal of the International Trumpet Guild. December, 1994.
Israel Music Institute
O'Loughlin, Niall. "Modern Brass", The Musical Times, Vol. 123, No. 1678, 250 Years of Covent Garden (Dec., 1982), p. 851
Reynish, Tim. Concerto List
Universal Music Group. "Contemporary Composers" Catalog, 2011.

 
Classical music lists